The assessment and plan (abbreviated A/P" or A&P) is a component of an admission note.

 Assessment includes a discussion of the differential diagnosis and supporting history and exam findings.
 The plan is typically broken out by problem or system. Each problem should include:
 brief summary of the problem, perhaps including what has been done thus far
 orders for medications, labs, studies, procedures and surgeries to address the problem.
 problems are commonly derived from
 chief complaint
 history of present illness
 review of systems (rarely; these should have been picked up and incorporated as new chief complaints during the interview)
 physical exam (rarely; these should have been picked up and incorporated as new chief complaints during the exam)
 social history, including counseling for smoking, alcohol, and illicit drug use
 family history
 medications may indicate problems that need to be addressed in the treatment of the other problems, such as dyslipidemia controlled with a statin.

References

Medical terminology